Hallam station may refer to:

 Hallam railway station, Hallam, Melbourne, Victoria, Australia
 Hallam FM (radio station), Sheffield, South Yorkshire, England, UK
 Hallam Nuclear Power Facility (nuclear power station), Nebraska, USA

See also
 West Hallam railway station, West Hallam, Derbyshire, England, UK
 Station (disambiguation)
 Hallam (disambiguation)